Tvindefossen (also written Tvinnefossen; also called Trollafossen) is a waterfall in Voss Municipality in Vestland county, Norway.

It is famous for its beauty. Buses sometimes stop for people to admire it. It was painted in 1830 by Johan Christian Dahl.

In addition, in the late 1990s the water at Tvindefossen acquired a reputation for rejuvenation and revival of sexual potency that made it one of the most important natural tourist attractions in western Norway, with as many as 200,000 people a year from the U.S., Japan and Russia visiting and filling containers with the water.

At one point it was Norway's ninth most visited natural attraction, with 272,000 visitors.

See also
List of waterfalls#Norway

References

External links

 Attractions in Voss at VisitNorway.com
 Tvinnefossen at BergenGuide.com

Voss
Waterfalls of Vestland